Tarakanovka is a rural locality (a selo) in Kabansky District, Republic of Buryatia, Russia. The population was 157 as of 2010. There are 2 streets.

Geography 
Tarakanovka is located 25 km east of Kabansk (the district's administrative centre) by road. Treskovo is the nearest rural locality.

References 

Rural localities in Kabansky District